Kelsey Browne (born 17 January 1992) is an Australian netball player in the Suncorp Super Netball league, playing for the Collingwood Magpies.

Career
Browne began her professional netball career as a replacement player for the Melbourne Vixens in the 2015 ANZ Championship season. She played for the Victorian-based club for two seasons before having a breakout year in 2017 at the Sunshine Coast Lightning in the new Super Netball league, where she developed a reputation as one of the most ruthless wing-attack players in the competition. Browne has represented Australia at under 17, 19 and 21 levels. Browne took her game to another level in the 2018 season and was rewarded with a call-up to the Australia national netball team for the Quad Series and 2018 Constellation Cup. Shortly afterwards she was signed by the Collingwood Magpies, joining sister Madi Robinson at the club for the 2019 season. She returned to the Diamonds for the 2019 Quad Series before winning selection as one of the 12 players picked for the World Cup squad, where she and her teammates won a silver medal.

In Round 13 of the 2019 season, Browne suffered a serious injury to her knee, ruling her out for up to 12 months. Nonetheless, she was re-signed by the club until the end of the 2021 season.

Super Netball statistics
Statistics are correct to the end of the 2018 season.

|- style="background-color: #eaeaea"
! scope="row" style="text-align:center" | 2017
|style="text-align:center;"|Lightning
| 0/0 || 171 || 0 || 276 || 434 || 3 || 4 || 62 || 37 || 15 
|- 
! scope="row" style="text-align:center" | 2018
|style="text-align:center;"|Lightning
| 0/0 || 302 || 0 || 383 || 498 || 4 || 1 || 50 || 53 || 15
|- style="background-color: #eaeaea"
! scope="row" style="text-align:center" | 2019
|style="text-align:center;"|Magpies
| 0/0 || 0 || 0 || 0 || 0 || 0 || 0 || 0 || 0 || 0
|- class="sortbottom"
! colspan=2| Career
! 0/0
! 473
! 0
! 659
! 932
! 7
! 5
! 112
! 90
! 30
|}

Personal life
In addition to her sister Madi, Browne's father Mark was also a sportsperson, playing Australian rules football for Geelong in the 1970s.

Browne currently studies a Bachelor of Exercise and Sport Science at Deakin University.

She is a singer/songwriter and studied a Bachelor of Arts (Music Performance) at Collarts in Melbourne.

References

External links
 Magpies Netball profile
 Super Netball profile
 Netball Draft Central profile

1992 births
Australian netball players
Sunshine Coast Lightning players
Collingwood Magpies Netball players
Melbourne Vixens players
Living people
2019 Netball World Cup players
Suncorp Super Netball players
Victorian Netball League players
Victorian Fury players
Australian Netball League players
Sportspeople from Geelong